Scopula larseni is a moth of the  family Geometridae. It is found in Saudi Arabia and Oman.

References

Moths described in 1982
larseni
Moths of Asia